Jesús Torres may refer to:
Jesús Torres (footballer) (born 1980), Spanish footballer
Jesús Torres (cyclist) (born 1954), Venezuelan cyclist
Jesús Torres Fernández (born 1960), Spanish wheelchair basketball player
Jesús Hurtado Torres (born 1965), Mexican politician
Jesús Torres (artist) (1898-1948), Mexican-American artist and sculptor